Mumin Booqora Gala or (Moumin Guelleh) (born 6 September 1986 in Djibouti City, Djibouti) is a Djiboutian runner. He competed at the 2012 Summer Olympics in the 5000m event and placed thirteenth.

Running career
In 2011, he took 7th place in the 5000 meters race during the All-Africa Games in Maputo, Mozambique. He was the 10000 m silver medalist at the 2011 Pan Arab Games in Doha. His personal best in the 5000 meters is 13 min 17 s 77 set in Birmingham, United Kingdom in 2011.

In 2012, he competed in the 5000 meters at the Olympic Games in London. Djibouti's National Olympic Committee (NOC), Comité National Olympique Djiboutien, selects athletes that meet the qualification standards. An NOC can to enter up to three qualified athletes in each individual event as long as each athlete met the "A" standard, or one athlete per event if they met the "B" standard. Mumin qualified via the A standard. Gala finished the first heat with a time of 13:21.21, finishing 10th in his heat. Although the first five from each heat move on to the finals, the next five fastest times are also qualified, and Gala was fifth on that list. Gala was close to his personal record of 13:17.77 in the first heat, but he finished the final with a time of 13:50.26 and placed 13th overall, out of a field of 43 athletes.

His 10000 m best is 28:23.46 set at the Blankers-Koen Stadium in Hengelo in 2012.

Gala continued competing at the Olympics by participating in the 2016 Summer Olympics in Rio. He set his personal record in the marathon, with a time of 2:13:04. Gala finished in 12th place.

International competitions

References 

1986 births
Living people
Djiboutian male long-distance runners
Djiboutian male marathon runners
Olympic athletes of Djibouti
Athletes (track and field) at the 2012 Summer Olympics
Athletes (track and field) at the 2016 Summer Olympics
World Athletics Championships athletes for Djibouti
Athletes (track and field) at the 2019 African Games
African Games competitors for Djibouti